Henryk Szczepański (7 October 1933 – 30 January 2015) was a Polish footballer who competed in the 1960 Summer Olympics.

Football career
Henryk Szczepański started his football career in the works club Stal Bydgoszcz and Polonia Bydgoszcz. From 1957 to 1960 he was a footballer for ŁKS Łódź, with whom he won the Polish Cup in 1957 and the following year the national championship. In 1960, together with Roman Corinth, he won the "Golden Shoe" in the"Katowice Sport"plebiscite. In 1961 he moved to Odra Opole, with whom he finished in the 1963–64 season 3rd place (the highest place in the history of the Oder in the top league). He played for the club until 1967.

Representative career
He made his debut for Poland on 29 September 1957 in Sofia in a friendly match against Bulgaria (1–1). He competed at the 1960 Summer Olympics in Rome. Henryk Szczepański's last match for the national team took place on 1 November 1965 in Rome, in a 1–6 loss to Italy in the 1966 World Cup qualifiers. In total, he played 45 official matches for the national team, of which 24 games where he wore the captain's armband.

Coaching career
After his football career ended, he worked as a coach, in Gwardia Warsaw, Olimpia Poznan, Motor Lublin and OKS OZOS Olsztyn.

Honours
ŁKS Łódź
 Polish Champion: 1958
 Polish Cup Winner: 1957

Odra Opole
 Polish League 3rd place: 1964
 Polish Cup Semi-Final: 1962
 Inter-Toto Cup Semi-Final: 1964

References

1933 births
2015 deaths
Association football midfielders
Polish footballers
Olympic footballers of Poland
Footballers at the 1960 Summer Olympics
ŁKS Łódź players
Odra Opole players
Poland international footballers
People from Wejherowo
Sportspeople from Pomeranian Voivodeship